The following is a list of episodes of Amor Mio, an Argentinian comedy television series that ran on Telefe from March 9, 2005 to December 6, 2005.

Series overview

Episodes

Season 1: 2006-2007

Amor Mio